Heart is a surname. Notable people with the surname include:

 Frank Heart (1929–2018), American computer engineer and Internet pioneer
 Monique Heart, American drag queen
 Zack Heart, Australian television and film personality

See also
Hart (surname); some persons with this surname may be erroneously referred to as "Heart"
 Heart (disambiguation)
 Heartz
Heart Evangelista (born 1985), Filipina actress and singer